Esmail Merat (7 March 1893 – 18 December 1949) was Iran's minister of education during Reza Shah reign. He is founder of some faculties of university of Tehran, including law faculty and technical faculty. He has also founded art section of University of Tehran.

He suggested a change in medical university law, which caused managing Tehran hospital under medical faculty. In 1956, in respect of his valuable works, one of university streets named to his name.

He was very eager to publish suitable educational books, which results in more than 200 high school books. Founding Academy of Persian Language and Literature was another organization which founded because of his suggestion and due to Reza Shah command.

Education and early life
Esmail born in September 1939 in Tehran. His father was Mirza Musa Khan Meratolmamalek.

He finished his undergraduate education in Tehran and after that he went to Europe in 1892 to continue his education. After passing few years in Switzerland and France, because of World War I and consequent difficulties, returned to Iran.

Career
In 1915, the ministry of education asked him and other students who returned from Europe to work in Dar ul-Funun as a teacher. Three years later, in 1918, he became minister of higher-teacher house of Iran. He was also teaching physics in this institute.
In September 1928, he accompanied student expedition as head of their elementary education to Paris. In Paris, Hossein Ala' asked him to stay there as Iranian students administrator and he accepted. While he was Iranian students administrator in France, he paid particular attention to students' behavior, which caused some students and employees to feel resentment.

In 1935, he has selected as head of higher education of Ministry of Education. After few months he abdicated this position and start working in ministry of economic affairs and finance.

In 1937, he became governor of Kerman for 9 months.

After resignation of Aliasghar Hekmat from his position, Esmail selected as his successor in July 1938. He officially started his work as minister of education on September 20, 1939. He was in this position till September 1941. Later in 1941, Mohammad Ali Foroughi asked him to return to his position, but he didn't accept because of hard working condition in those days. By Foroughi's insistence, he accepted to work as Minister of health and medical education. He resigned on November 12, 1941.

See also
Fazlollah Reza
Mohammad Farhadi

References

Chancellors of the University of Tehran
1893 births
1949 deaths
Politicians from Tehran
Government ministers of Iran
Iranian governors
Education ministers of Iran